The 2017 Diamond Head Classic was a mid-season eight-team college basketball tournament that was played on December 22, 23, and 25 at the Stan Sheriff Center in Honolulu, Hawaii. It was the ninth annual Diamond Head Classic tournament, and was part of the 2017–18 NCAA Division I men's basketball season. USC defeated New Mexico State to win the tournament championship.

Bracket
* – Denotes overtime period

Campus Site Games

Championship Round

Source:

References

Diamond Head Classic
Diamond Head Classic
Diamond Head Classic